Top Model Curves, season 1  was the first season of Top Model Curves. The first season features eighteen plus size models, who competed together for approximately twelve weeks. The first season aired from August to November 2016 in Denmark, Sweden and Norway.

The winner of the competition was 19-year-old Ronja Manfredsson from Sweden.

Contestants
(ages stated are at start of contest)

Episodes

Week 1
Original airdate:  & 

Eliminated outside of judging panel: Janina Karlman

 
Best photo: Aida Almquist Sowe, Lovisa Reuter,     Malene Riis Sørensen, Maria Esbo, Mette Elofsson & Paulina Perger
Quit: Martine Halvorsen
Bottom two: Helena Thompson & MC Christensen
Eliminated: MC Christensen

Week 2
Original airdate:  & 

First call-out/Best photo: Malene Riis Sørensen
Eliminated: Linda Selmoni
Bottom two: Benedicte Haugaard & Helena Thompson
Eliminated: None

Week 3
Original airdate:  & 

Challenge winner: Aida Almquist Sowe, Charlotte Skogrand Bø, Jannie Gefle, Maria Esbo & Mette Elofsson

 
Immune: Helena Thompson, Kathleen Ladani, Lovisa Reuter, Malene Riis Sørensen, Maria Esbo, Mette Elofsson & Ronja Manfredsson
Best photo: Kathleen Ladani & Ronja Manfredsson
First call-out: Ronja Manfredsson
Campaign winner: Ronja Manfredsson
Bottom two: Anne-Mette Tassing & Paulina Perger
Eliminated: Anne-Mette Tassing

Week 4
Original airdate:  & 

Challenge winner: Kathleen Ladani
First call-out/Best photo: Paulina Perger   
Bottom two: Charlotte Skogrand Bø & Mette Elofsson
Eliminated: Mette Elofsson

Week 5
Original airdate:  & 

Challenge winner: Aida Almquist Sowe, Benedicte Haugaard, Charlotte Skogrand Bø, Kathleen Ladani, Lovisa Reuter & Malene Riis Sørensen
First call-out: Guro Mangen & Maria Esbo
Best photo: Helena Thompson 
Eliminated: Charlotte Skogrand Bø
Bottom two: Kathleen Ladani & Ronja Manfredsson
Eliminated: None

Week 6
Original airdate:  & 

Challenge winner: Benedicte Haugaard
First call-out/Best photo: Kathleen Ladani
Bottom two: Guro Mangen & Paulina Perger
Eliminated: Guro Mangen

Week 7
Original airdate:  & 

Challenge winner: Aida Almquist Sowe
First call-out: Malene Riis Sørensen & Ronja Manfredsson
Best photo: Aida Almquist Sowe
Campaign winner: Aida Almquist Sowe 
Bottom two: Helena Thompson & Kathleen Ladani
Eliminated: Helena Thompson

Week 8
Original airdate:  & 

Challenge winner: Ronja Manfredsson
First call-out: Ronja Manfredsson
Bottom two: Benedicte Haugaard & Kathleen Ladani
Eliminated: None

Week 9
Original airdate:  & 

Challenge winner: Lovisa Reuter
First call-out: Ronja Manfredsson
Best photo: Aida Almquist Sowe
Bottom two: Kathleen Ladani & Paulina Perger
Eliminated: Kathleen Ladani

Week 10
Original airdate:  & 

Eliminated outside of judging  panel: Paulina Perger
Challenge winner: Ronja Manfredsson
First call-out/Best photo: Maria Esbo
Bottom two: Benedicte Haugaard & Lovisa Reuter
Eliminated: Benedicte Haugaard

Week 11
Original airdate:  &

First panel
Challenge winner: Malene Riis Sørensen
First call-out/Best photo: Malene Riis Sørensen
Bottom two: Aida Almquist Sowe & Lovisa Reuter
Eliminated: Lovisa Reuter

Second panel
Challenge winner: None
First call-out/Best photo: Ronja Manfredsson
Bottom two: Aida Almquist Sowe & Jannie Gefle
Eliminated: None

Week 12
Original airdate:  &

First panel
Eliminated: Maria Esbo
Bottom two: Jannie Gefle & Malene Riis Sørensen 
Eliminated: None

Second panel
Eliminated outside of judging panel: Jannie Gefle
Eliminated: Aida Almquist Sowe
Final two: Malene Riis Sørensen & Ronja Manfredsson
Scandinavia's Next Top Model: Ronja Manfredsson

Call out order

  The contestant was eliminated at judging panel
 The contestant won best picture of the week
 The contestant was part of a non-elimination bottom two. 
 The contestant was eliminated outside of judging panel
 The contestant quit the competition
 The contestant was immune from elimination
 The contestant won the competition

Photo shoot guide
Week 1 photo shoot: Posing in groups with sea animals
Week 2 photo shoot: Sightseeing 
Week 3 photo shoot: Babyliss hair campaign in pairs
Week 4 photo shoots: Gymnasts; surfers
Week 5 photo shoots: Eyes above water; femme fatales
Week 6 photo shoot: Portraying David Bowie & James Bond
Week 7 photo shoot: Posing in lingerie
Week 8 photo shoot: Robyn Lawley swimwear with male models
Week 9 photo shoots: Posing in a little black dress; recreating famous magazine covers
Week 10 photo shoot: Helly Hansen winter collection
Week 11 photo shoots: Couture dresses; posing with a horse
Week 12 photo shoot: Cover shoot for SLiNK magazine

References

External links
 Official Swedish website

Scandinavia
2016 Danish television seasons
2016 Norwegian television seasons
2016 Swedish television seasons